Gerard Healy (born 1 March 1961) is a former Australian rules footballer and commentator.
Healy attended St Bede's College in Mentone, where he was the senior football captain. Gerard is a trained physiotherapist.

VFL career

Melbourne Demons
Beginning his career with the Melbourne Football Club in 1979, Healy played mostly in a forward pocket role in attack before switching to an on-baller/midfielder role and establishing himself as one of the premier ball winners in the competition. He won Melbourne's best and fairest award in 1984.

Sydney Swans
He left the Demons in 1985, after playing 130 games, moving to the Sydney Swans at the beginning of the 1986 season. He immediately made an impact at the Swans, winning best and fairests in his first three years with the team – 1986, 1987, 1988. Season 1988 was to prove the finest of his career. In addition to the Swans' Best & Fairest award, Healy took home the Brownlow Medal as the VFL's fairest and best player, the VFL Players Association MVP and the Simpson Medal for best on ground in the Victoria vs Western Australia state game played in Perth. He retired from Sydney in 1991 due to a serious wrist injury. He was later recognised as one of Sydney's greats, being named in their Team of the Century. Following his forced retirement Collingwood picked Healy in the 1991 Pre-Season Draft on the chance that his injury would recover but Healy never played another AFL match.

In 2000 Healy was inducted into the Australian Football Hall of Fame. On 18 July 2009, he was also inducted into the Sydney Swans Hall of Fame.

Playing statistics

|- style="background-color: #EAEAEA"
! scope="row" style="text-align:center" | 1979
|style="text-align:center;"|
| 39 || 21 || 10 || 19 || 244 || 71 || 315 || 55 ||  || 0.5 || 0.9 || 11.6 || 3.4 || 15.0 || 2.6 || 
|-
! scope="row" style="text-align:center" | 1980
|style="text-align:center;"|
| 39 || 7 || 4 || 9 || 123 || 52 || 175 || 36 ||  || 0.6 || 1.3 || 17.6 || 7.4 || 25.0 || 5.1 || 
|- style="background-color: #EAEAEA"
! scope="row" style="text-align:center" | 1981
|style="text-align:center;"|
| 39 || 22 || 27 || 14 || 295 || 157 || 452 || 92 ||  || 1.2 || 0.6 || 13.4 || 7.1 || 20.5 || 4.2 || 
|-
! scope="row" style="text-align:center" | 1982
|style="text-align:center;"|
| 3 || 21 || 77 || 55 || 263 || 89 || 352 || 99 ||  || 3.7 || 2.6 || 12.5 || 4.2 || 16.8 || 4.7 || 
|- style="background:#eaeaea;"
! scope="row" style="text-align:center" | 1983
|style="text-align:center;"|
| 3 || 19 || 37 || 41 || 198 || 72 || 270 || 98 ||  || 1.9 || 2.2 || 10.4 || 3.8 || 14.2 || 5.2 || 
|-
! scope="row" style="text-align:center" | 1984
|style="text-align:center;"|
| 3 || 20 || 19 || 25 || 304 || 133 || 437 || 81 ||  || 1.0 || 1.3 || 15.2 || 6.7 || 21.9 || 4.1 || 
|- style="background:#eaeaea;"
! scope="row" style="text-align:center" | 1985
|style="text-align:center;"|
| 3 || 20 || 15 || 18 || 301 || 125 || 426 || 84 ||  || 0.8 || 0.9 || 15.1 || 6.3 || 21.3 || 4.2 || 
|-
! scope="row" style="text-align:center" | 1986
|style="text-align:center;"|
| 3 || 22 || 26 || 21 || 344 || 212 || 556 || 82 ||  || 1.2 || 1.0 || 15.6 || 9.6 || 25.3 || 3.7 || 
|- style="background:#eaeaea;"
! scope="row" style="text-align:center" | 1987
|style="text-align:center;"|
| 3 || 20 || 22 || 18 || 302 || 185 || 487 || 65 || 37 || 1.1 || 0.9 || 15.1 || 9.3 || 24.4 || 3.3 || 1.9
|-
! scope="row" style="text-align:center" | 1988
|style="text-align:center;"|
| 3 || 20 || 26 || 34 || 351 || 218 || 569 || 89 || 25 || 1.3 || 1.7 || 17.6 || 10.9 || 28.5 || 4.5 || 1.3
|-style="background:#eaeaea;"
! scope="row" style="text-align:center" | 1989
|style="text-align:center;"|
| 3 || 8 || 6 || 4 || 150 || 64 || 214 || 22 || 9 || 0.8 || 0.5 || 18.8 || 8.0 || 26.8 || 2.8 || 1.1
|-
! scope="row" style="text-align:center" | 1990
|style="text-align:center;"|
| 3 || 11 || 7 || 12 || 212 || 100 || 312 || 37 || 12 || 0.6 || 1.1 || 19.3 || 9.1 || 28.4 || 3.4 || 1.1
|- class="sortbottom"
! colspan=3| Career
! 211
! 276
! 270
! 3087
! 1478
! 4565
! 840
! 83
! 1.3
! 1.3
! 14.6
! 7.0
! 21.6
! 4.0
! 1.4
|}

Honours and achievements

Broadcasting career
After retiring in 1990, Healy became an commentator with the Seven Network on their AFL coverage. Healy was a special comments in 5 AFL grand finals with Seven.

On radio, he has also been a long-time special comments man on 3AW for their AFL coverage, as well as hosting Sports Today since 1996. He gave a heartfelt farewell message on the show to his co-host David Hookes after his death in 2004. Hookes was later replaced on the show by Dwayne Russell.

His audio commentary also has been used for computer games, including as AFL 2007 along with Dennis Cometti.

Following Seven losing the AFL rights, Healy joined Nine Network as a special commentator for the 2002 & 2003 seasons, before moving to Fox Footy Channel from 2004 in the same role until its closure in 2006 as well as hosting On the Couch in which he did during his time on Nine. He continued his commentary role for AFL matches with Fox Sports from 2007 and since 2012 on second version of Fox Footy.

Personal life
Gerard Healy is married to Lisa (née Gluyas) and together they have three daughters.

References

1961 births
All-Australians (1953–1988)
Australian Football Hall of Fame inductees
Australian rules football commentators
Brownlow Medal winners
Leigh Matthews Trophy winners
Victorian State of Origin players
Bob Skilton Medal winners
Living people
Melbourne Football Club players
Sydney Swans players
Keith 'Bluey' Truscott Trophy winners
Australian rules footballers from Victoria (Australia)
E. J. Whitten Medal winners
Australia international rules football team players
3AW presenters